James T. Powers  (1868 – after 1890) was a 19th-century Major League Baseball player who was a pitcher for the 1890 Brooklyn Gladiators in the American Association.

References

External links

Major League Baseball pitchers
19th-century baseball players
Brooklyn Gladiators players
Baseball players from New York (state)
1868 births
Year of death missing